Saad Khamis (Arabic:سعد خميس) (born 15 February 1995) is an Emirati footballer who plays as a forward.

External links

References

Emirati footballers
1995 births
Living people
Al Shabab Al Arabi Club Dubai players
Hatta Club players
Al Ain FC players
Emirates Club players
UAE Pro League players
UAE First Division League players
Association football forwards